The Renault Koleos is a compact crossover SUV manufactured by the French manufacturer Renault. The majority of the production is coming from the Busan plant of Renault Samsung Motors. The first generation was marketed as the Renault Samsung QM5 and the second generation is marketed as the Renault Samsung QM6. It was first presented as a concept car at the Geneva Motor Show in 2000, and then as a production model in 2006 at the Paris Motor Show.

A second generation was unveiled at the 2016 Beijing Motor Show, and uses the Renault–Nissan CMF-CD modular platform shared with the Nissan X-Trail/Rogue (T32) and Renault Kadjar.

It is scheduled to be discontinued in 2023.



First generation (HY; 2006)

Overview
The Koleos was an addition to the Renault compact SUV market, after selling the Scénic RX4 and the Kangoo, but it has never produced a true crossover SUV. A Koleos concept car was shown in the media as long ago as February 2000. It was unveiled in 2006 at the Paris Motor Show and launched two months later.

The Koleos' body design was based on the Renault Koleos and Renault Egeus concept cars. Some of the Koleos's competitors, such as the Citroën C-Crosser and the Peugeot 4007, were also presented by the time it was launched. ADAC of Germany awarded five stars to the Koleos, in a crash test done in August 2008.

A facelifted Koleos was unveiled in July 2011, and shown at the Frankfurt Motor Show in September 2011. In August 2010, the Koleos was withdrawn from the United Kingdom, due to poor sales of under 2,600 units. Production ended in March 2015.

Worldwide Marketing

South Korea
For the market in South Korea, the Koleos was manufactured by Renault Samsung Motors (a subsidiary of Renault) at its Busan plant in South Korea, and was sold as the Renault Samsung QM5 (H45).

India
In the market in India, Renault introduced the Koleos on 8 September 2011. The popular Koleos registered a 51% year on year growth in the first half of 2011. It is currently being sold across five continents, and in markets as diverse as Europe, Mexico, South America and Asia Pacific.

It is available with a 2.0 dCi diesel engine, with a maximum power output of 150 PS at 4000 rpm, and peak torque of 320 Nm at 2000 rpm.

Engines
The range of engines:

Gallery

Second generation (HC; 2016) 

A second generation of the Koleos was introduced at the 2016 Beijing Motor Show, by Renault's chief Carlos Ghosn. Despite a wide-ranging rumour that the latest Renault SUV would be called the Maxthon, the company has instead decided to reinstate the name Koleos.

The larger second-generation Koleos uses the Common Module Family (CMF-CD) modular platform developed jointly by Renault and Nissan, and already used on similar vehicles as the third-generation Nissan X-Trail and the Renault Kadjar.

In some versions, the car has three drivetrain options: two-wheel drive, four-wheel drive mode that adapts power, torque distribution between axles to improve traction, and a standard four-wheel drive. The updated Koleos has been awarded a five-star safety rating by Euro NCAP.

As standard, the car has a seven-inch touchscreen, while higher trim levels have an infotainment system with an 8.7 inch touchscreen (called R Link 2). Gearboxes are manual and automatic. The new Koleos first went on sale in Australia on 1 August 2016 and has been rolled out in most of Asia, Europe, and South America by the middle of 2017.

The facelift of 2020 arrived in Mexico in the end of October 2019. The SUV was scheduled to be shown at the 2020 Manila International Auto Show on April 2, 2020, by Renault Samsung Motors as the QM6.

It was discontinued in the United Kingdom in July 2020 due to sluggish sales, three years after it was reintroduced to the British market and ten years after the original model ended UK sales.

Sales

References

21 https://www.autocar.co.uk/car-news/new-cars/renault-koleos-axed-uk-%E2%80%98commercial-reasons%E2%80%99

External links
 (France)
 (UK)
 (Renault Samsung QM6)

Koleos
Compact sport utility vehicles
Crossover sport utility vehicles
All-wheel-drive vehicles
Euro NCAP large off-road
Euro NCAP small off-road
Cars introduced in 2007
Vehicles with CVT transmission
2010s cars